Ken Smale (born 5 November 1933) is a former Australian rules footballer, who played in the Victorian Football League (VFL).

Born in Warrnacknabeal Smale played as a forward for the town team and he won the Wimmera Football League goalkicking award in 1952 and 1953. Keen to have a go in the VFL he wrote to Collingwood asking for a try out. He spent the Easter Saturday in Melbourne with a six-game permit in case he was wanted. Collingwood was impressed and he got a clearance.

Ken Smale was a forward player in the losing Grand Finals against Melbourne in 1955 and 1956 but he was on the bench when Collingwood won the 1958 VFL Grand Final.

Smale left Collingwood after the premiership win to return to his hometown of Warracknabeal, finishing with 324 games for the club and winning two premierships.

In 2008 Collingwood granted him a life membership.

References

External links
 
 

Australian rules footballers from Victoria (Australia)
Collingwood Football Club players
Collingwood Football Club Premiership players
Warracknabeal Football Club players
1933 births
Living people
One-time VFL/AFL Premiership players